Kristian Osvald Viderø (27 May 1906, in Skálavík – 8 April 1991, in Copenhagen) was a Faroese clergyman, poet and Bible translator. In 1985 he won the Faroese Literature Prize for his works.

Biography
After theological studies in Denmark, Viderø oversaw the completion of a translation of the Old Testament into the Faroese language, which Jákup Dahl had worked on until his death in 1944. He was the parish priest of Hattarvík from 1965 to 1969.
Viderø was commemorated on a Faroese postage stamp in a series on Faroese Bible translators in June 2007.

Bibliography 
 Ferð mín til Jorsala. Tórshavn: E. Thomsen, 1984.
 Á Suðurlandið. Tórshavn: E. Thomsen, 1990.
 Ferð mín til Jorsala á himni. Tórshavn:: E. Thomsen, 1990.
 Á annað Suðurlandið: ferð mín til Jorsala Oman av himni. Tórshavn: E. Thomsen, 1990.
 Frá landi á fyrsta sinni. Tórshavn: E. Thomsen, 1991.
 Saga Skálavíkar, Húsavíkar, Skarvanesar, Dals, Skúoyar, Dímunar, Sands, Skopunar, Hestoyar, Kolturs Tórshavn: E. Thomsen, 1991.
 Saga Suðuroyar. Tórshavn: Bókagarður, 1994.
 Saga Vágoyar og Mykiness. Tórshavn: Bókagarður, 1994.
 Saga Eysturoyar. Tórshavn: Bókagarður, 1994.
 Ferð mín til Damaskusar. Tórshavn: Bókagarður, 1997.

See also

 List of Faroese people

References

External links 
 The Bible in Faroese as translated by Dahl and Viderø

1906 births
1991 deaths
People from Skálavík Municipality
Faroese Lutheran clergy
Faroese male novelists
Translators to Faroese
Faroese male poets
Faroese-language poets
Lutheran poets
Translators of the Bible into Faroese
20th-century translators
20th-century Danish novelists
20th-century Faroese poets
20th-century Danish male writers